Parque de los Tecajetes is a park in the city of Xalapa, in the state of Veracruz in eastern Mexico. Formed on a natural depression, underneath the ground is a  fresh-water spring that feeds the aqueducts, artificial pools and canals that are a characteristic of the park.

References

Xalapa
Parks in Mexico
Protected areas of Veracruz